The Baishan Dam (meaning: "White Mountain Dam") is an arch-gravity dam on the Second Songhua River near the town of Baishanzhen, Huadian, Jilin Province, China. The purpose of the dam is hydroelectric power generation and flood control. The dam supplies water to five turbine-generators in two different powerhouses for an installed capacity of  while it can also control a design  flood. Additionally, it has a  pumped-storage hydroelectric generation capacity. It is named after Baekdu Mountain (White Mountain), near the city of Baishan.

Construction
Construction on the dam began in May 1975, the reservoir began to fill on September 16, 1982 and by the end of 1984, the first phase of three generators was operational. Another two generators in the project's second phase were operational by 1992.

In March 2000, a feasibility study report on a pumped-storage capability for the dam was approved. In August 2002, construction started on installing two 150 MW reversible pump generators and by July 2006, they were operational.

Design
The dam's spillway contains four  openings and three  mid-level openings on its orifice.

The dam powers three separate power stations. The first station to be constructed is located underground and contains 3 x 300 MW Francis turbine generators while the second, located on the left bank slightly downstream contains 2 x 300 MW Francis turbine generators. The third portion of the dam's power station is 2 x 150 MW pump-generators. The dam's current reservoir serves as the upper and the Hongshi Dam's reservoir downstream serves as the lower.

See also 

 List of power stations in China

References

Dams on the Second Songhua River
Dams in China
Arch-gravity dams
Buildings and structures in Jilin
Hydroelectric power stations in Jilin
Pumped-storage hydroelectric power stations in China
Baishan
Dams completed in 1984
Energy infrastructure completed in 1984
Energy infrastructure completed in 1992
Energy infrastructure completed in 2006